Recepköy can refer to the following villages in Turkey:

 Recepköy, Çelikhan
 Recepköy, Kepsut